William Mostyn  was a 17th-century Welsh Anglican priest.

The son of Sir Roger Mostyn, M.P., he was born in Flintshire and educated at Queens' College, Cambridge. He became a Fellow of St John's College, Cambridge in 1625; and was incorporated at Oxford in 1639. He became Archdeacon of Bangor in 1633, Rector of Christleton in 1634 and Vicar of Whitford, Flintshire in 1639.

He died c. 1669/1670 at Plâs Mostyn, Wrexham.

References

People from Flintshire
Archdeacons of Bangor
17th-century Welsh Anglican priests
Alumni of Queens' College, Cambridge
Fellows of St John's College, Cambridge
17th-century deaths
Year of birth missing
Year of death uncertain